The ISE Tower is one of the highrises located at 55, Jinnah Avenue of the Blue Area business district of Islamabad.

Companies headquarters

Islamabad Stock Exchange Towers is a twin 22 storey towers.
Air China Pakistan office
Etihad Airlines Pakistan office
OMV Pakistan office at 17 Floor
ICBC Pakistan office
NEC Worldwide (Pakistan) (Nippon Electric Company of Japan) is located on the Ground Floor, Islamabad Stock Exchange Towers
The airline Airblue has its head office on the 12th floor.
The head offices of the oil and gas exploration company MOL Pakistan occupies 17th though 19th floor of the building.

See also 

 Blue Area
 List of tallest buildings in Islamabad
 List of tallest buildings in Pakistan

References

External links
Islamabad Stock Exchange Towers on YouTube

Islamabad
Skyscrapers in Islamabad
Blue Area
Office buildings completed in 2009
Skyscraper office buildings
Pakistan Stock Exchange